Ancala is a genus of horse flies in the family Tabanidae.

Species
Ancala africana (Gray, 1832)
Ancala brucei (Ricardo, 1908)
Ancala fasciata (Fabricius, 1775)
Ancala latipes (Macquart, 1838)
Ancala necopina (Austen, 1912)
Ancala nilotica (Austen, 1906)	
Ancala septempunctata (Ricardo, 1908)
Ancala subvittata (Ricardo, 1908)

References

Tabanidae
Brachycera genera
Diptera of Africa
Taxa named by Günther Enderlein